William Darke (1736 – November 26, 1801) was an American soldier who served with British forces before the Revolutionary War. He served with British regulars commanded by Major General Edward Braddock in his 1755 expedition to the French-controlled Ohio Valley, as part of the French and Indian War. The British forces were defeated  and Braddock died.

Darke survived to be commissioned as a captain at the beginning of the American Revolutionary War. He was made prisoner at the Battle of Germantown. He was commanding colonel of the Hampshire and Berkeley regiments at the capture of General Cornwallis. Darke was often a member of the Virginia legislature and, during the convention of 1788, voted for the Federal Constitution.

A lieutenant-colonel of the regiment of "Levies" in 1791, he commanded the left wing of St. Clair's army at its defeat by the Miami Indians on November 4, 1791. He made two unsuccessful charges in that fight: his younger son, Captain Joseph Darke, died in the second, and he himself was wounded and barely survived. Darke wrote a letter to President George Washington that described the battle. Afterward, Darke served as a major-general of the Virginia militia.

Early life 
William Darke was born in Bucks County, Pennsylvania on May 6, 1736, the son of Joseph Darke and his wife, according to the "Hopewell Friends History." He was descended from early Quaker settlers at the Falls in Bucks County. He was a cousin of Benjamin Rush, signer of the Declaration of Independence.

As a young child in 1740, Darke moved with his family moved to the Elk Branch near Shepherdstown, Virginia. Darke had two brothers and one sister. As a child he contributed to the household: he fished, ploughed, and planted. He was described as "a strong man of his hands", and "herculean".

Military career 
During the French and Indian War, Darke served with George Washington in the 1755 Braddock Expedition under the command of British General Edward Braddock. Braddock's plan was to capture Fort Duquesne from the French to gain control over the Ohio River and valley. Even though there were many casualties and the British were defeated, Darke was not injured. Braddock died in the battle.

In the American Revolutionary War, Darke served as a Continental Army captain in the 8th Virginia Regiment; he was wounded and taken prisoner at the Battle of Germantown in 1777. He was held in a British prison ship in New York Harbor until his exchange in 1780. He was promoted to lieutenant colonel and was probably present at the siege of Yorktown in 1781.

After the war, he was sent out against the insurgents in the Whiskey Rebellion in 1784. With peace established, Darke served in the Virginia Convention in 1788 and subsequently was elected to and served in the Virginia legislature. As a lieutenant colonel in the Kentucky militia, Darke commanded the left wing at the disastrous Battle of the Wabash in 1791 during the Northwest Indian War. His son Captain Joseph Darke died as a result of wounds received in the battle.

In 1790, General Josiah Harmar, with a poorly trained and ill-equipped army and volunteer militia, was sent to attack the Northwestern Confederacy of Indians on the upper Maumee River. Harmar was soundly defeated. President George Washington reinforced the army and assigned General Arthur St. Clair to command. St. Clair went north from Fort Washington, Ohio and built Fort Hamilton and Fort Jefferson. On October 1791, St. Clair left Fort Jefferson and camped at a spot later called Fort Recovery on November 3, 1791. On November 4, his army of 1,400 men was surprised at sunrise by a large party of Indians. Within a few hours, St. Clair was forced to retreat under cover provided by Darke. Nine hundred men, women and children were reportedly killed.

Personal life 
Darke married Sarah, the widow of William Delayea, an Indian fighter. The two had four children: John, Joseph, Samuel, and Mary. His three sons all died while young men. Darke took in Thomas Worthington, the 14-year-old orphaned son of a family friend, and gave him an education. Worthington became the sixth governor of Ohio. William Darke has descendants through son John's daughter Elizabeth and through daughter Mary's two marriages.

Legacy 
Darke County, Ohio is named for him, as is Darkesville, West Virginia.

Notes

References 
 
 
Neville, Gabriel (2018). "A Forty Year Bond: William Darke and George Washington in Politics, Business and War." The Magazine of the Jefferson County Historical Society, 84:23-38.

External links 
 
The 8th Virginia Regiment (history site)
"The Grim Days of 1791" (biographical video)

1736 births
1801 deaths
American militia generals
American people of the Northwest Indian War
American Revolutionary War prisoners of war held by Great Britain
Continental Army officers from Virginia
Delegates to the Virginia Ratifying Convention
18th-century American politicians
People from Bucks County, Pennsylvania
People from Shepherdstown, West Virginia
People of Virginia in the French and Indian War
People of colonial Pennsylvania